Gardner Cave is located in extreme northeastern Washington state inside Crawford State Park. Only the first  are open to public access.

The cave is adorned with stalactites, stalagmites, flowstone, pools, and a column 2 feet in diameter.

History 
A local bootlegger named Ed Gardner claimed to have discovered the cave in 1899 when the earth collapsed beneath him and his horse. According to one account, Mr. Gardner lost his deed to the cave and adjacent lands to William Crawford in a game of poker.

Geology 
The cave formed within Metaline Limestone, a formation from the Cambrian. The surrounding area has been glaciated in at least the last two glacial advances. Several underground stream channels enter the cave near the Mud Room, the furthest section from the entrance, and a seasonal lake occurs when the area is not completely flooded.

References

Caves of Washington (state)